Danny Bravo (born January 29, 1948) is an American former child actor, best known as the voice of Hadji in the TV series Jonny Quest.

Early life
He was born Daniel Zaldivar in Los Angeles, California. His surname Zaldivar is of Basque origin.

Career
After a handful of minor film appearances, he played the title role of an Indian boy training a race horse, to win money to build a shrine for his village, in the 1960 film For the Love of Mike (credited as "Danny Zaidivar").  The same year he had a minor role in the classic Western film The Magnificent Seven.  In 1962 he played the title character "Ramon", a Latino boy featured prominently in an episode of 87th Precinct.  He provided the voice of the character Hadji, the Calcutta-raised foster brother of the title character in the well-remembered animated television series Jonny Quest (1964–1965).  He continued acting and doing voice work for a few years after its cancellation.

Filmography

Film

Television

References

External links

1948 births
Living people
American male child actors
American male film actors
American male television actors
American male voice actors
Male actors from Los Angeles
20th-century American male actors